Gephyrostegidae is an extinct family of reptiliomorph tetrapods from the Late Carboniferous including the genera Gephyrostegus, Bruktererpeton, and Eusauropleura. Gephyrostegus is from the Czech Republic, Brukterepeton is from Germany, and Eusauropleura is from the eastern United States.

References

Reptiliomorphs
Pennsylvanian first appearances
Pennsylvanian extinctions